Pius A. "Pete" Dalton is a Canadian former politician. He served in the Legislative Assembly of New Brunswick from 1987 to 1991, as a Liberal member for the constituency of Kings East.

References

New Brunswick Liberal Association MLAs
Living people
Year of birth missing (living people)